Queen line may refer to:

Queen subway line, a previously proposed rapid transit line in Toronto, Ontario but which was never built
collectively, the streetcar lines serving Queen Street (Toronto):
501 Queen
502 Downtowner
503 Kingston Road
Relief Line (Toronto), a currently proposed rapid transit line that would run along Queen Street